This is a list of Natchathara (Stars) Temples of Hindus. These temples are also called Nakshathiram Temples or Birth Star Temples.

References

Natchathara temples